Nettie Wiebe (born January 22, 1949) is a Canadian professor. She grew up near Warman, Saskatchewan. She has a BA and MA in Philosophy from the University of Saskatchewan and a PhD in Philosophy from the University of Calgary.

Wiebe first became widely known as the Women's President from 1988–1994 and the President and CEO from 1995-1998 of the National Farmers Union. During her term she vocally defended the role of the Canadian Wheat Board in the marketing of prairie grains.

In 2001, Wiebe sought the leadership of the Saskatchewan New Democratic Party (and by implication, the office of Premier of Saskatchewan, as the party was in government at the time), following the retirement of then premier and party leader Roy Romanow. For the first time in Saskatchewan, the NDP utilized One Member One Vote as its means of selecting a leader rather than a delegated leadership convention. Wiebe ran on the most explicitly left-wing platform of the major contenders, and placed third behind Chris Axworthy and the eventual winner, Lorne Calvert.

Wiebe chose not to run for a seat in the Legislative Assembly of Saskatchewan in the subsequent 2003 provincial election. However, she did run, unsuccessfully, as the federal New Democratic Party candidate in the 2004 federal election in the riding of Saskatoon—Humboldt, against Conservative candidate Brad Trost, Liberal candidate Patrick Wolfe, and incumbent independent Jim Pankiw. In what was the closest four-way race in the country, Wiebe placed second, with only 417 fewer votes than the winner, Brad Trost, and only 18 more votes than Wolfe (the third place candidate).

In the 2006 Canadian federal election, Wiebe ran as the NDP candidate in the riding of Saskatoon—Rosetown—Biggar, but lost to incumbent Conservative Carol Skelton.

Wiebe is currently a professor of church and society at St. Andrew's College in Saskatoon, Saskatchewan. She was once again the NDP candidate in Saskatoon—Rosetown—Biggar in the 2008 federal election, but Conservative candidate Kelly Block defeated her by just 262 votes (0.98%), Wiebe's narrowest loss to date. She was considered a potential candidate for the 2009 Saskatchewan NDP leadership convention, following Calvert's resignation on October 17, 2008. Wiebe later announced she would not run for the provincial leadership and instead focus on federal politics. Wiebe was re-nominated as the NDP candidate for Saskatoon—Rosetown—Biggar for the 2011 federal election.  Block once again defeated Wiebe, this time prevailing by 538 votes.  Notably, both women increased their percentage of popular support at the expense of the Liberals and Greens.

Electoral record

 
Source: Elections Canada - Official Voting Results

References

External links
 Nettie Wiebe
 Nettie Wiebe bio on the St. Andrew's College, University of Saskatchewan website.
 National Farmers Union website

1949 births
Living people
Canadian philosophers
New Democratic Party candidates for the Canadian House of Commons
Saskatchewan candidates for Member of Parliament
Canadian women in federal politics
Women in Saskatchewan politics
University of Saskatchewan alumni
University of Calgary alumni
Canadian women philosophers
20th-century Canadian philosophers
21st-century Canadian philosophers
21st-century Canadian women politicians
20th-century Canadian women